Mikhail Semyonov or Semenov may refer to:

Mikhail Semyonov (basketball) (1933-2006), Russian basketball player
Michail Semenov (b.1986), Belarusian cross-country skier
Mikhail Innokentyevich Semyonov (1938-2019), Russian politician
Mikhail Nikolayevich Semyonov (b.1969), Russian football player and coach

See also
Mikhail Siamionau (b.1984), Belarusian wrestler